Barry Lambson (born 28 August 1958) is a South African former cricket umpire. He stood in five Test matches between 1992 and 1995 and 35 ODI games between 1992 and 2001. He umpired 148 matches of first-class cricket and 240 matches of List A cricket in South Africa between 1985 and 2009.

See also
 List of Test cricket umpires
 List of One Day International cricket umpires

References

1958 births
Living people
Sportspeople from Johannesburg
South African Test cricket umpires
South African One Day International cricket umpires